Mullah Hamidullah Akhundzada is the current Minister of Civil Aviation and Transport of the Islamic Emirate of Afghanistan since 7 September 2021.

References

Living people
Taliban government ministers of Afghanistan
Year of birth missing (living people)